John of Lusignan (French: Jean de Lusignan; c. 1329 or 1329/1330 – 1375) was a regent of the Kingdom of Cyprus and titular Prince of Antioch. He was son of King Hugh IV of Cyprus and his second wife Alix of Ibelin. He was a member of the House of Lusignan.

Life
While being a regent of Cyprus, he launched an attack on Mamluk ports. He attacked Sidon on 5 June 1369, but after a day of skirmishes, his fleet was diverted by a storm, he later avoided fortified Beirut, but managed to pillage both Botron and Tartus, then he went further north to Latakia, Ayas and Antalya, before attacking Alexandria on 9–10 July, where the Cypriots tried in vain to seize a large Moroccan merchantman, they later returned to Sidon on 19 July, where they managed to land and defeat the garrison, but forced to evacuate due to a storm, they eventually cast anchor at Famagusta on 22 July.

He was murdered as a result of his involvement in the murder of his elder brother, King Peter I of Cyprus. The historian Stefano Lusignan was his descendant. This is the Prince John that the Prince John Tower of the St. Hilarion Castle was named after. Tradition says that he killed the two Bulgarians that constituted his personal guard, by throwing them one by one from the windows of that particular tower.

Marriage and issue

He married twice, firstly in 1343 to Constance of Sicily (died after April 19, 1344), daughter of Frederick III of Sicily and Eleanor of Anjou, without issue, and secondly in 1350 to Alice of Ibelin, by whom he was the father of: 
 James of Lusignan (died 1395/1397), Titular Count of Tripoli, married in 1385 to his cousin Mary, ditte Mariette, (wrongly called Margaret) of Lusignan (c. 1360 – c. 1397), once engaged to Carlo Visconti, daughter of his uncle Peter I of Lusignan and second wife Eleanor of Aragon, the parents of:
 John of Lusignan (died 1428/1432), Titular Count of Tripoli, unmarried and without issue
 Peter of Lusignan (died February 10, 1451), Regent of Cyprus, Titular Count of Tripoli, etc
 Eleanor of Lusignan (died c. 1414), married c. 1406 her cousin Henry of Lusignan (died 1427), Titular Prince of Galilee, son of James I of Lusignan, King of Cyprus, and wife Helvis or Helisia of Brunswick-Grubenhagen, without issue
 Loysia of Lusignan, (probably) married after March 19, 1406 her cousin Eudes/Odo of Lusignan (died Palermo, 1421), Titular Seneschal of Jerusalem, in the service of the King of Aragon, son of James I of Lusignan, King of Cyprus, and wife Helvis or Helisia of Brunswick-Grubenhagen, without issue

Out of wedlock he had one illegitimate son by Alice Embriaco de Giblet: 
 John of Lusignan (died after 1410), Titular Lord of Beirut, married in 1385 to Marguerite de Morpho, the parents of:
 John of Lusignan (died c. 1456), Titular Lord of Beirut

References

Sources
 

14th-century births
1375 deaths
People of the Kingdom of Cyprus
Regents of Cyprus
Princes of Antioch
House of Poitiers-Lusignan